The 2019 season is Brann's fourth season back in Eliteserien since their relegation at the end of the 2014 season.

Squad

Out on loan

Transfers

Winter

In

Out

Loans out

Released

Competitions

Eliteserien

Results summary

Results by round

Results

Table

Norwegian Cup

Europa League

Qualifying rounds

Squad statistics

Appearances and goals

|-
|colspan="14"|Players away from Brann on loan:

|-
|colspan="14"|Players who left Brann during the season:

|}

Goal scorers

Disciplinary record

References

Brann
SK Brann seasons